Jevto Dedijer (Serbian Cyrillic: Јевто Дедијер; 15 August 1880 – 24 December 1918) was a Bosnian-Serb writer and geographer from the Maleševci clan who was influential in the formation of the Serb Academy.  He was born to a peasant family in Čepelica (village), Bileća (municipality), Bosnia and Herzegovina, which was then a part of Austria-Hungary (although the region was still officially a part of the Ottoman Empire).  He then attended the Mostar Gymnasium and studied at the Belgrade Higher School and at the University of Vienna, earning his doctorate at the latter institution in 1907.

He was employed at the National Museum in Sarajevo until the annexation of Bosnia and Herzegovina in 1908 by Austria-Hungary, making the region an official part of the empire. He then became professor at the School of Theology in Belgrade and in 1910.

During World War I, he immigrated to France and then to Switzerland.  After the war, he moved to the State of Serbs, Croats and Slovenes, which later became the Kingdom of Serbs, Croats and Slovenes.  He died on 24 December 1918 in Sarajevo from the Spanish flu aged only 38.  He had three sons: Vladimir, who served as a Yugoslav partisan in World War II and became a biographer of Josip Broz Tito; Boro; and Stevan, a pioneer of business intelligence who also served in World War II but in the United States Army with the 101st Airborne Division.

See also
 Vladimir Dedijer
 Stevan Dedijer

External links
 

1880 births
1918 deaths
Deaths from Spanish flu
People from Bileća
Serbs of Bosnia and Herzegovina
Maleševci
Jevto
Serbian writers